Jean-François du Soleil, also known with the Italian name of Francesco dal Sole (1490 – 1565), was a French mathematician, astronomer and engineer. He was also a grammatician, orator and poet.

Life 
Native of Chateau-Thierry about 1490, soon he moved to Italy. He was active in Venice and Ferrara. He died about 1565.

Among his works the Libretto di abaco, published in Venice in 1526, is considered a basic text from the school of Borgi and Pacioli.

Works

Notes 

1490 births
1565 deaths
16th-century French astronomers
French engineers
16th-century French mathematicians
People from Château-Thierry